John Marks may refer to:

John E. Marks (born 1951), British poet
John Marks (businessman) (1916–1982), business investor - refer Lend Lease Communities
John Marks (mayor) (born 1947), mayor of Tallahassee, Florida
John Marks (ice hockey) (born 1948), NHL player
John Marks (tennis) (born 1952), Australian tennis player
John B. Marks (1777–1872), political figure in Upper Canada
John D. Marks (born 1943), author, and founder and president of Search for Common Ground
John Marks (doctor) (1925–2022), chairman of the British Medical Association
Johnny Marks (1909–1985), American songwriter
John H. P. Marks (1908–1967), writer and translator
John Marks (Australian politician) (1827–1885), Australian farmer and politician
John L. Marks, American football coach
John Christian (musician) (born 1981), Dutch dj, formerly known as John Marks

See also
Jon Marks (1947–2007), jazz pianist
Jack Marks (disambiguation)
Jonathan Marks (disambiguation)
John Mark (disambiguation)